Carron Angus Cyril Oliver Lodge (Born 1882, in Bruges, Belgium – 24 June 1910, in London) was an English figure and landscape painter.

The son of a barrister, he trained as an artist and was a Royal Academy Schools student from 27 January 1903 to January 1908. He went on to exhibit at the Royal Academy between 1906-10. Lodge was the father of the black and white artist Francis Graham Lodge. At the age of 27, Carron Lodge died at home from an overdose of sulphonal. At the time his wife Winifred was expecting their second child.

Exhibits
 Royal Academy
 Cat No. 1048	Commerce  in 1906
 Cat No. 1453  The Good Samaritan in 1907
 A watercolour drawing depicting a study for The Good Samaritan was given to the V&A by Carron's sister, Miss Winifred M. Lodge. The watercolour can be viewed in the V&A Collections  Signed 'C. O. Lodge. 1905.'
 New English Art Club in 1910
 Cat No.  65 The Path to the Monastery
 Cat No. 109 The King's Vision
 Cat No. 162 Nativity
 Royal Society of Artists, Birmingham (1)
 Walker Art Gallery, Liverpool (1)
 London Salon (6)

Residences
 1907 at 9 Gatestone Rd, Upper Norwood, SE
 1910 at 14 Belgrave Road, London NW (where he died)

Notable relatives
First Cousins Once Removed
Sir Oliver Lodge (scientist)
Sir Richard Lodge (historian)
George Edward Lodge (artist)
Eleanor Constance Lodge

Second Cousin 
Oliver W. F. Lodge

References

20th-century English painters
English male painters
Artists from Bruges
1910 deaths
1880s births
20th-century English male artists
British expatriates in Belgium